Elnis Palomino Castillo (born  in San Pedro de Macorís) is a Dominican Republic male volleyball player who competed with the Dominican club La Romana in the 2013 FIVB Club World Championship.

Career
Palomino was chosen Rookie of the Year in the 2006 Dominican Republic league, while playing with the club José Martí. With the Dominican club Sánchez Ramírez Palomino played the 2008 Dominican Republic League season, winning the bronze medal.

Palomino played with Distrito Nacional contributing to win the 2010 season Dominican Republic Volleyball League championship. He then played with the professional club from the Argentinian League Instituto Dr. Carlos Pellegrini for the 2010-2011 season. With his national team, he won the bronze medal in the 2009 Pan-American Cup and he played the 2010 edition and won the bronze again in the 2012 cup.

With the Dominican Republic national team he lost the chance to play the 2014 World Championship, after winning the gold medal and best server in the first round, but his team lost to Puerto Rico the final qualifier round.

Palomino lost the bronze medal in the 2010 Central American and Caribbean Games2-3 from Mexico but he won the 2014 regional games gold medal, the country's first ever gold.

Palomino played in the 2013 FIVB Club World Championship with the Dominican club La Romana finishing in tied seventh place. With his national team, Palomino won the 2013 NORCECA Final Four Cup silver medal and the Best Server individual award. In 2014, Palomino played with the Dominican local team Los Alcarrizos from the Santo Domingo provincial tournament.

For the 2014-2015 season he signed with the Lebanese club Riseleh Sarafand. For this contract he was expelled from the national team because his Lebanese club was blamed of not paying the international transfer fee and for playing without permission. He was later reinstated but refused to come back to the national team citing mistreatment and the difference of training conditions of the male and female national team. Palomino played with Team IE from the American Professional Volleyball League in the 2016 season, ranking seventh with his team.

Clubs
  José Martí (2006)
  Sánchez Ramírez (2008)
  Distrito Nacional (2010)
  Instituto Dr. Carlos Pellegrini (2010-2011)
  Maccabi Hod Hasharon (2011-2012)
  La Romana (2013)
  Los Alcarrizos (2014)
  Riseleh Sarafand (2014-2015)
  Team IE (2016)

Awards

Individuals
 2013 NORCECA Final Four "Best Server"

Clubs
 2008 Dominican Republic Volleyball League –  Bronze medal, with Sánchez Ramírez
 2010 Dominican Republic Volleyball League -  Champion, with Distrito Nacional

References

External links
 FIVB Profile

1986 births
Living people
Dominican Republic men's volleyball players
Sportspeople from San Pedro de Macorís
Central American and Caribbean Games gold medalists for the Dominican Republic
Competitors at the 2014 Central American and Caribbean Games
Central American and Caribbean Games medalists in volleyball